John Hager may refer to:
 John S. Hager (1818–1890), U.S. Senator from California
 John H. Hager (1936–2020), American politician from Virginia and U.S. Assistant Secretary of Education
 John Henry Hager (Iowa politician) (1870–1952), American politician from Iowa 
 John Hager (cartoonist) (1858–1932), cartoonist of Dok's Dippy Duck